The China-Taiwan Yayi Cup is a Go competition.

Outline
The tournament is sponsored by Yayi and the Taiwan Qiyuan. It is a team tournament between professional Go players from China and Taiwan. There are 3 rounds where 5 players from each team compete with each other. The results of the players are then tallied and whoever has the most wins win the tournament.

Past winners

International Go competitions